Roger Hamilton Vick (born August 11, 1964) is a former professional American football fullback in the National Football League (NFL) for the New York Jets and Philadelphia Eagles from 1987 to 1990. He played college football at Texas A&M University. He also played on the Orlando Thunder in the World League.

Vick was the only fullback selected in the first round of the 1987 NFL Draft. The selection of Vick is a notable moment in draft history, primarily due to the audible outburst of despair made by a fan in attendance.

Vick's best season came in 1988 when he rushed for 540 yards on 128 carries (4.2 YPC) and three touchdowns. He also had 19 catches for 120 yards that season.

References

External links
 

1964 births
Living people
People from Conroe, Texas
American football fullbacks
Sportspeople from Harris County, Texas
Texas A&M Aggies football players
New York Jets players
Philadelphia Eagles players
Orlando Thunder players
People from Tomball, Texas